Yoon Sung-sik (born 1970) is a South Korean television director and producer.

Filmography

As director 
Drama City "Booyong of Mt. Kyeryong" (KBS2, 2005-2006)
Dae Jo Yeong (KBS1, 2006-2007)
Drama City "Thanks To" (KBS2, 2008)
The Slingshot (KBS2, 2009)
Drama Special "Summer Story" (KBS2, 2010)
Drama Special "Just Say It" (KBS2, 2010)
Bridal Mask (KBS2, 2012)
You're the Best, Lee Soon-shin (KBS2, 2013)
The King's Face (KBS2, 2014-2015)
Hwarang (KBS2, 2016-2017)
Babel (TV Chosun, 2019)
Mr. Queen (tvN, 2020-2021)

As producer 
Detectives in Trouble (KBS2, 2011)
Trot Lovers (KBS2, 2014)
Love Returns (KBS1, 2017) (Executive)

References

External links 
 
 
 
 

Living people
1970 births
South Korean television directors
South Korean television producers